Stadio Rubens Fadini is a multi-use stadium in Giulianova, Abruzzo, Italy.  It is currently used mostly for football matches and is the home ground of Real Giulianova.  The stadium holds 4,347 spectators.

Football venues in Italy
Giulianova